Ruqaiya Hasan (3 July 1931 – 24 June 2015) was a professor of linguistics who held visiting positions and taught at various universities in England. Her last appointment was at Macquarie University in Sydney, from which she retired as emeritus professor in 1994. Throughout her career she researched and published widely in the areas of verbal art, culture, context and text, text and texture, lexicogrammar and semantic variation. The latter involved the devising of extensive semantic system networks for the analysis of meaning in naturally occurring dialogues.

Biography
Born in 1931 in Pratapgarh, Uttar Pradesh, India, Hasan took her undergraduate degree at the University of Allahabad, in 1953, in English literature, education and history. Her elder brother Zawwar Hasan who was working as a journalist in Pakistan brought her and the rest of the family to Lahore in 1954. From 1954 to 1956, she was a lecturer at the Training College for Teachers of the Deaf, in Lahore, Pakistan. In 1958, she completed an MA in English literature at Government College Lahore, the University of the Punjab. From 1959 to 1960 she was a lecturer in English language and literature at Lahore's Queen Mary College. With a British Council scholarship, Hasan went to Edinburgh where she completed a postgraduate diploma at the University of Edinburgh in applied linguistics. In 1964 she completed her PhD in linguistics, also at the University of Edinburgh. The title of her thesis was 'A Linguistic Study of Contrasting Features in the Style of Two Contemporary English Prose Writers'. The writers were Angus Wilson and William Golding. She drew on Halliday's early work, in particular, his "Categories of the Theory of Grammar" paper, which had been published in 1961.

Between 1964 and 1971 she held various research fellowships, first with the Nuffield Foreign Languages and Teaching Materials Project, at the University of Leeds, where she directed the Child Language Survey. Between 1965 and 1967 she was a research fellow with the Nuffield Programme in Linguistics and English Teaching, at University College London. From 1968 to 1971, she worked in the Sociological Research Unit, with Basil Bernstein, where she directed the Nuffield Research Project on Sociolinguistic Aspects of Children's Stories. Following this she went to the Department of Linguistics and Anthropology, at Northwestern University in Illinois, before returning to England and taking up a lectureship in the Department of Modern Languages and Linguistics at the University of Essex. She migrated to Australia in 1976, and was appointed senior lecturer in linguistics at Macquarie University. She retired from Macquarie in 1994 as emeritus professor. She has held numerous visiting appointments in the US, Kenya, Japan, Singapore, Denmark, and Hong Kong.

Contributions to linguistics
Hasan worked in her career of more than 50 years in linguistics around a number of central concerns, but all have set out from a basic conviction concerning the "continuity from the living of life right down to the morpheme".

Her early PhD research began a long interest in language and verbal art. In the 1960s she worked at the Sociolinguistic Research Centre with Basil Bernstein, on issues concerning the relation of language and the distribution of forms of consciousness. This engagement spawned both her later work on semantic variation, and provided the impetus and data for her early studies of what underpins text unity—in her terms, texture and text structure. in 1976, with MAK Halliday she published what remains the most comprehensive analysis of cohesion in English. In their further co-authored book, Language Context and Text: Aspects of Language in a Social-Semiotic Perspective, Hasan set out the interrelationships of texture and text structure (i.e. her notion of "generic structure potential", or "GSP").

In all of these endeavours, language as a social semiotic (following the account of language developed by MAK Halliday over many years) served as the point of departure.

The specific type of connection she saw between language and social context has meant that her work has been concerned with many important problems in linguistics, such as the relations between language and culture, language and social class, language and learning (see Collected Works below). A distinguishing feature of her contributions is her work on many of these larger questions at the same time as attending to matters of detailed linguistic description.

She divided linguistic theories into two categories: "externalist" and "internalist". She applied the term "externalist" to those theories where language is assigned a "subsidiary role" in the creation of meaning. In such theories, language plays no role in bringing about the existence of the thing to be understood or expressed. In the externalist approach, "language is reduced to a name device: it becomes a set of 'names' that label pre-existing things, properties, events, actions, and so on. It is a condition of naming that the phenomena should exist and be recognisable as having specific identities quite independent of the 'names' that the speakers of the language choose to give them." She urged linguists to abandon the externalist view, arguing instead for a linguistic model "that is capable of doing two seemingly disparate things at once: first, we need to show that meanings are the very artefact of language and so are internal to it; and secondly, that these linguistically created meanings nonetheless pertain to our experience of the world around us and inside us".

Studies in context

Hasan followed but extended the model of linguistic context set out by Michael Halliday going back to the 1960s, in which he proposed that linguistic context must be seen as a "semiotic construct" with three essential parameters: field, tenor and mode. Hasan argued that context is essential to resolving Saussure's dichotomy of 'langue' and 'parole'. 
Hasan made a theoretical distinction between "relevant context" [aspects of context encapsulated in the text], and what she called in 1973 the 'material situational setting'. 'Relevant context' she defines as "that frame of consistency which is illuminated by the language of text" and "a semiotic construct". Since relevant context is a "semiotic construct", she argued that it should be "within the descriptive orbit of linguistics". Further, since systemic functional linguistics is a social semiotic theory of language, then it is incumbent on linguists in this tradition to "throw light on this construct".

Hasan critiqued the typical application of Halliday's terms "field", "tenor" and "mode" by systemic linguists, on the basis that the terms have been applied as if their meaning and place in the theory was self-evident. She argued for the application of the system network as a mechanism for the systematic description of the regularities across diverse social contexts.

Studies in semantic variation

While working at Macquarie University in Sydney, Hasan undertook 10 years of research into the role of everyday language in the formation of children's orientation to social context. She adopted the term semantic variation to describe her findings from this research, a term first coined by Labov and Weiner. Having proposed the concept, the authors explicitly rejected the possibility of semantic variation as a sociolinguistic concept, except as possibility a function of age.

Hasan's work was an empirical investigation of semantic variation. Her findings represent linguistic correlates of Basil Bernstein's conception of "coding orientation". Hasan collected some 100 hours of naturally occurring discourse in families across distinct social locations. She used the terms higher-autonomy professional and lower-autonomy professional to distinguish social locations, the latter describing professionals who have discretion over the way their working time is organized, as distinct from those whose time is at the discretion of others higher up in a workplace hierarchy. The findings are set out in Hasan 2009, the second volume of her collected papers. Of this work on semantic variation, Jay Lemke, adjunct professor of communication at the University of California, writes:

The results of this work were at least twofold. First, it established in great detail and with high statistical significance that across social class lines there were major differences in how mothers and young children from working class vs middle class families framed questions and answers, commands and requests, and grounds and reasons in casual conversation in normal settings. And second, it showed that the usual mode of teachers’ talk with these children was if anything an exaggerated version of the typical middle-class ways of meaning.
The theoretical significance goes well beyond even these important results. Educationally, and in terms of social policy, it faces us with the truth of Basil Bernstein's hypothesis of many years ago that ways of meaning differ significantly across social class positions, and that home and school, functioning as critical settings for socialization, tend to inculcate these ways of meaning and then evaluate and classify them in ways that lead to or at least significantly support the realities of social class differentiation and hierarchization in modern societies (Bernstein, 1971). Linguistically and sociologically, Hasan argues from her data, variation in meaning making must be considered an integral if not the primary factor in our understanding of the role of language in the constitution of social structure."

Studies in verbal art
Hasan's studies of verbal art are a linguistic extension of the Prague School, and in particular the work of Jan Mukařovský. According to Hasan, of the Prague School linguists Mukařovský has produced "the most coherent view of the nature of verbal art and its relation to language". Mukařovský argued that poetic language cannot be characterised by reference to a single property of language.  The aesthetic function is instead a mode of using the properties of language. From Mukařovský, Hasan took the notion of foregrounding.

The process of foregrounding, or making salient, depends on contrast: an aspect of the text's language, or a set of textual features, can only be foregrounded against a patterning which becomes the ‘background’. This is the notion of a figure and ground relationship. Foregrounding, for Hasan, is contrast with respect to the norms of the text. However the idea of contrast is not self-evident. We need to be able to specify under what conditions a pattern in language is significant such that we consider it to be foregrounded, and, therefore, can attribute to it some of the responsibilities for conveying the text's deeper meanings.

A pattern draws attention to itself, i.e. is foregrounded, when it displays consistency. There are two aspects to this consistency: consistency in terms of its "semantic drift" (Butt 1983) and consistency in terms of its textual location. Semantic drift refers to the manner in which an ensemble of features take the reader toward “the same general kind of meaning” (Hasan, 1985a: 95). Consistency of textual location refers not to any gross notion of location, such as every other paragraph or every five lines. Rather, consistency of textual location refers to “some significant point in the organisation of the text as a unity” (ibid: 96). The process of attending to the foregrounded patterns in the text is the means by which we proceed from simple statements about the language to an explication of the ‘artness’ of the text.

Ultimately, Hasan describes the patterning of language patterns as 'symbolic articulation'. 'Symbolic articulation' is the means by which a process of "second-order semiosis" emerges, that is the process by which "one order of meaning acts as metaphor for a second order of meaning”.

Selected works
 Hasan, Ruqaiya. 1996. Ways of Saying: Ways of Meaning. Selected Papers of Ruqaiya Hasan, eds. C. Cloran, D. Butt & G. Williams. London: Cassell.
 Hasan, Ruqaiya. 2005. Language, Society and Consciousness. Collected Works of Ruqaiya Hasan, Vol. 1, ed. J. Webster. London: Equinox.
 Hasan, Ruqaiya. 2009. Semantic Variation: Meaning in Society and Sociolinguistics. Collected Works of Ruqaiya Hasan, Vol. 2, ed. J. Webster. London: Equinox.
 Hasan, Ruqaiya. 2011. Language and Education: Learning and Teaching in Society. Collected Works of Ruqaiya Hasan, Vol. 3, ed. J. Webster. London: Equinox.
 Hasan, Ruqaiya. 2016. Context in the System and Process of Language. Collected Works of Ruqaiya Hasan, Vol. 4, ed. J. Webster. London: Equinox.
 Hasan, Ruqaiya. 2019. Describing Language: Form and Function. Collected Works of Ruqaiya Hasan, Vol. 5, ed. J. Webster. London: Equinox.
 Hasan, Ruqaiya. 2017. Unity in Discourse: Texture and Structure. Collected Works of Ruqaiya Hasan, Vol. 6, ed. J. Webster. London: Equinox.
 Hasan, Ruqaiya. forthcoming. Verbal Art: A Social Semiotic Perspective. Collected Works of Ruqaiya Hasan, Vol. 7, ed. J. Webster. London: Equinox.

See also
Metafunction

Notes

References

External links
  Collected Works of Ruqaiya Hasan
  Ruqaiya Hasan on Vimeo SFL Linguists group

Systemic functional linguistics
1931 births
2015 deaths
20th-century Indian linguists
Indian women linguists
People from Pratapgarh district, Uttar Pradesh
Scientists from Uttar Pradesh
21st-century Indian linguists
20th-century Indian women scientists
21st-century Indian women scientists
Women scientists from Uttar Pradesh
Scholars from Uttar Pradesh
Educators from Uttar Pradesh
Women educators from Uttar Pradesh